Night of 1000 Stars is the fourth album released by Blame Sally.

Track listing

Personnel 
 Monica Pasqual - vocals, piano, accordion, harmonium, keyboard
 Jeri Jones - mandolin, guitar, slide guitar, vocals, bass
 Pam Delgado - drums, percussion, vocals, harmonium, acoustic guitar
 Renee Harcourt - guitar, mandolin, vocals, harmonica, banjo, bass, lapsteel

Additional personnel 
 Rob Strom - bass
 BZ Lewis - electric guitar
 Michaelle Goerlitz - pandeiro
 Shweta Jhaveri - vocal
 Irene Sazer - violin

Production 
 Producer - Lee Townsend
 Recording engineers - Shawn Pierce, Adam Munoz
 Mixing engineer- Shawn Pierce
 Mastering engineer - Greg Calbi
 Additional recording - David Luke (Ninth Street Opus Studio, Berkeley, CA), BZ Lewis (Studio 132, Oakland, CA), Renee Harcourt (The Laurel Way Studio, Mill Valley, CA)
 Recorded and mixed at Ninth Street Opus Studio, Berkeley, CA
 Mastered at Sterling Sound New York, NY
 Cover illustration - Hugh Andrade and Mati McDonough
 Photography - Michal Venera
 Design - Renee Harcourt

2010 albums
Blame Sally albums